Vasilați is a commune in Călărași County, Muntenia, Romania. It is composed of three villages: Nuci, Popești and Vasilați. Gălbinași village belonged to Vasilați until 2005, when it was split off to form Gălbinași Commune.

Natives
 Dinu Cristea

References

Communes in Călărași County
Localities in Muntenia